Uranyl metaphosphate is a compound of uranium, phosphorus, and oxygen. It is one of the phosphates of uranium with the formula [UO2(PO3)2]n. This long-chain compound is formed via the thermal decomposition of UO2(H2PO4)2·3H2O. Double salts such as NaUO2(PO3)3 and CsUO2(PO3)3 are known.

At elevated temperature, it decomposes to UP2O7, liberating oxygen.

References

Uranyl compounds
Metaphosphates